Francisco Cerro (born 9 February 1988) is an Argentine footballer who plays for Montevideo Wanderers as a midfielder.

Club career
Cerro started his professional career in 2008 playing for Quilmes in the Primera B Nacional (Argentine second division). During the 2009–10 season, he helped Quilmes to obtain promotion to the Argentine Primera División. During his team's one-season stay in the Primera, Cerro played 23 games (9 in the 2010 Apertura and 14 in the 2011 Clausura), and scored two goals.

For the 2011–12 Argentine Primera División season, Cerro was loaned to Vélez Sársfield with a US$750,000 option to buy. He signed his contract with Vélez on August 4, 2011. Initially a substitute for Héctor Canteros, Cerro became a regular starter for the team during the 2012 Clausura and Copa Libertadores, playing 21 games during the semester.

The midfielder was eventually purchased by Vélez and started 13 games (scoring once) during Vélez's 2012 Inicial title-winning campaign.

After tough negotiations, on 5 February 2014 is confirmed as the new reinforcement Racing Club, following the purchase of 90% of his passes. On February 15, makes its official debut with the albiceleste jersey in the 1-0 defeat against San Lorenzo in the New Gasometer, entering halftime replaces José Luis Gómez. Despite the defeat,  Pancho  performed well in his debut, since that party has won the title and is one of the leaders of the team, providing strength and good play with the ball under his breath.

In 2014 champion is crowned Racing Club having played two matches (against Banfield and Olimpo of Bahia Blanca) after 13 years of waiting. Currently he has 27 games played goalless in  Racing Club . In 2015 their current statistics are in the Libertadores Cup and played 4 games in the First Division of Argentina, has 14 games played.

On 18 July 2017, Cerro moved abroad for the first time in his career, signing for Segunda División club Rayo Vallecano. After earning promotion to LaLiga and finishing as champions on his first season at Rayo, the club announced his departure from the club along with teammates Ernesto Galán and Diego Aguirre.

International career
Cerro debuted for the Argentina national football team in 2012, playing a friendly against Brazil in a team formed exclusively with local league players.

Honours
Vélez Sársfield
Argentine Primera División: 2012 Inicial

Rayo Vallecano
Segunda División: 2017–18

References

External links
 
 

1988 births
Living people
People from Santiago del Estero
Argentine footballers
Argentine expatriate footballers
Argentina international footballers
Association football midfielders
Sportspeople from Santiago del Estero Province
Quilmes Atlético Club footballers
Club Atlético Vélez Sarsfield footballers
Racing Club de Avellaneda footballers
Rayo Vallecano players
Defensa y Justicia footballers
Central Córdoba de Santiago del Estero footballers
Aldosivi footballers
Montevideo Wanderers F.C. players
Argentine Primera División players
Segunda División players
Uruguayan Primera División players
Argentine expatriate sportspeople in Spain
Argentine expatriate sportspeople in Uruguay
Expatriate footballers in Spain
Expatriate footballers in Uruguay